Mark Spoon (27 November 1966 – 11 January 2006) was a disc jockey, musician and record producer from Frankfurt am Main, Germany. Together with Rolf Ellmer (Jam El Mar) he recorded under several monikers, including Jam & Spoon, Tokyo Ghetto Pussy and Storm. He also produced and remixed many other artists as well as becoming a veteran performer many times at Berlin's Love Parade.

Spoon, born as Markus Löffel, began his professional career as a cook before changing direction and working as a DJ in the late 1980s. He adopted the stage name Mark Spoon, a direct translation of his birth name: Löffel is the German word for spoon. In the early 1990s he teamed up with Jam El Mar (a classically trained guitarist) as Jam & Spoon. Their greatest hits (in Germany) were "Right in the Night" (1994) and "Kaleidoscope skies" (1997). Spoon was a pioneer in trance music and remixed seminal tracks, including Moby's Go (In Dub Mix) (1992), in addition to his work under other names. In 2001 he performed in the German film Be Angeled, for which he also contributed the title song.

In January 2006, he was found dead in his Berlin apartment after suffering a heart attack. The 2006 Love Parade contained a live performance of "Be Angeled" in tribute of Spoon.

External links
  Official website
 Mark Spoon discography (from Discogs)
 Jam and Spoon unofficial fan page
  Loveparade Hall of Fame
  Housepool.de: "In memoriam: Mark Spoon"
  "Techno-DJ Mark Spoon tot aufgefunden" (from Spiegel Online)

1966 births
2006 deaths
German electronic musicians
German DJs
German record producers
20th-century German musicians
Electronic dance music DJs